A by-election was held for the New South Wales Legislative Assembly electorate of Boorowa on 30 September 1899 because Kenneth Mackay resigned to accept an appointment to the Legislative Council.

Dates

Result

Kenneth Mackay resigned to accept an appointment to the Legislative Council.

See also
Electoral results for the district of Boorowa
List of New South Wales state by-elections

References

1899 elections in Australia
New South Wales state by-elections
1890s in New South Wales